Stemper may refer to:

Surname:
Alfred Matthew Stemper-bishop of Roman Catholic Archdiocese of Rabaul
Charles J. Stemper - two-term member of the Wisconsin State Assembly
Pierre Stemper-former mayor of Flaxweiler, Luxembourg

Geography:
Lake Stemper, a lake in Florida